Victoria Finney is a British actress on stage, screen and radio. On TV, she is best known as Louise Richards in Families from 1990 to 1993. Finney has also performed in the TV series The Grand, Children's Ward, The Bill and Holby City. On stage, she has appeared in Shakespeare and in contemporary plays, to critical acclaim: "outstanding .... her performance ... steals the show"; "excellent performance with [her] exhibition of strong and dignified womanhood"; "Finney ... plays Kath with quiet assurance and wit". She is married to theatre producer Julian Crouch.

Selected stage performances

References

External links

British television actresses
British soap opera actresses
Year of birth missing (living people)
Living people